Edward Lamar Hopson is a former professional boxer.

Early life
Edward Hopson was born June 30, 1971, in St. Louis, Missouri to St. Louis natives, Edward and Mittie Hopson, nee Walters.

Amateur career
Hopson took up boxing at the age of seven. Hopson earned a Junior Olympics gold medal in 1987, and was the National Golden Gloves Featherweight Champion the following year. Later in 1988, he won the Olympic Trials in the featherweight division; after a semifinal victory against world amateur champion Kelcie Banks, Hopson took a 3–2 decision over Carl Daniels. However, at the Olympic Boxoffs, Hopson lost to Banks in a pair of fights; because of these losses, he did not compete in the 1988 Summer Olympics.

Professional career
Known as "Fast" Eddie, Hopson turned pro in 1989 and captured the vacant International Boxing Federation super featherweight title in 1995 with a knockout win over Moises Pedroza. He lost the belt in his first defense, to Tracy Harris Patterson, later that year by 2nd round technical knockout (TKO), a round in which Hopson had four knockdowns recorded against him.

Death
Edward Hopson passed away June 20, 2022, in St. Louis, MO due to complications with pancreatitis. His family held a small service in Spanish Lake, Missouri and he is buried in Oak Grove Cemetery.

References

External links
 

1971 births
American male boxers
boxers from Missouri
featherweight boxers
International Boxing Federation champions
living people
southpaw boxers